The 1988 season was the Hawthorn Football Club's 64th season in the Victorian Football League and 87th overall.

Fixture

Premiership season

Finals series

Ladder

References

Hawthorn Football Club seasons